The 2019–20 Albanian Basketball Superleague, is the 54th season of the top professional basketball league in Albania.

Competition format
The six clubs played a four-legged round robin tournament where the four first qualified teams would advance to the playoffs.

The fifth qualified team faced the runner-up of the second division in a best-of-three games playoff for avoiding relegation, and the last qualified team was directly relegated.

Clubs and arenas

Regular season

League table

Results

Playoffs
The semi-finals were played in a best-of-three playoff format and the finals in a best-of-five playoff format (1-1-1-1-1).

Bracket

Semi-finals

|}

Finals

|}

Relegation playoffs
Team from the ABL plays legs 1 and 3 at home.

|}

References

External links
Albanian Basketball Federation site

Superleague
Albania
Basketball
Basketball